Lustre is a color grading software developed by Autodesk. It runs on Autodesk Systems certified hardware, as Flame Premium, Flame and Smoke Advanced. It is part of the Flame Premium package.

History

Development
Lustre was originally a 5D product called Colossus, developed by Colorfront. After the demise of 5D in 2002, Autodesk  acquired the license to distribute the Lustre software, and later acquired Colorfront entirely.

Lustre originated as a plugin for Autodesk's Flame product under the name "Colorstar" to emulate film type color grading using printer lights controls. It was then developed as a standalone software.  It was introduced under the Colossus name in private demonstrations at IBC show in Amsterdam in 2001. Alpha and beta testing were held at Eclair Laboratoires in Paris.
During the trials, Colossus was running on the Windows XP operating system, but the same code base was also used on the IRIX operating system.

The original creators of Lustre are Mark and Aron Jaszberenyi, Gyula Priskin, Tamas Perlaki, Gabor Forgacs, Ferenc Bechtold.

Lustre is now integrated in the Flame Premium package.

Version history
Lustre 1.0 was released on Windows XP. It had a "Discreet" skin to have the buttons look like Flame and Smoke. The hotkeys were also changed from Colossus to match neither Flame nor Smoke.
Lustre 2.5 had the first implementation of wiretap, the way to access Flame and Smoke libraries directly into the application browser. It was read only.
Lustre 2.7 was the first iteration to see the Linux release and the integration of Incinerator, a cluster of render nodes to process pictures.
Lustre 2008 was a Windows only release with the addition of an editing timeline.
Lustre 2009 saw Windows and Linux releases back in sync.
Lustre 2012 ext1 saw the introduction of the Source grading workflow, allowing to see and grade the original source clips in a Flame/Smoke timeline and render them back as individual segments with all effects kept back into a Flame/Smoke timeline.

Overview
The Lustre architecture uses CPU and GPU optimizations to obtain realtime playback on high resolution files, as required for digital cinema color grading.

The original control surface was the Tangent Devices CP100.  Later Autodesk developed the Autodesk Control Surface manufactured by Tangent Devices. Since version 2012 Lustre also supports the Tangent Device Element, which is used by many grading applications on the market.

References

External links
 Colorfront
Autodesk
Workflowers

Autodesk products